Sherman Ali Ahmed   is an Indian politician member of Indian National Congress. He is an MLA, elected from the Baghbar constituency in the 2011 Assam Legislative Assembly election as an All India United Democratic Front  candidate. In 2016 and 2021 assembly election he was re-elected from the same constituency as an Indian National Congress candidate. In 2022, activist Sumitra Hazarika made a first information report (FIR) regarding his televised comments about rape.

References 

Indian National Congress politicians from Assam
Living people
People from Barpeta district
Assam MLAs 2021–2026
Year of birth missing (living people)